State Highway 32 (SH 32)  is a proposed loop around the southern side of Brownsville from I-69E/US 77/US 83 to SH 4. The route is still in the planning stages.

Route description
SH 32 is planned to begin at an intersection with I-69E/US 77/US 83 in Brownsville. From there, it will head southeast to FM 1419. It will continue east along the alignment of FM 1419 to FM 3068. From this intersection, SH 32 will head northeast to its eastern terminus at SH 4.

History

 SH 32 was a route proposed on October 9, 1917 from Corsicana southeast to Huntsville. On September 26, 1939, this route was reassigned to U.S. Highway 75 (which it was cosigned with before this). The current route was designated on April 29, 2010 over new locations and part of FM 1419.

SH 32A was a spur designated on October 20, 1919 from Buffalo southwest via Jewett and Normangee to Navasota. On July 20, 1920, SH 32A was completely changed, so that it went from Navasota via Anderson and Singleton to Madisonville. This spur was renumbered as SH 90 on August 21, 1923.

Major intersections

References

032
State Highway 032
Texas 032